Mohammed Ridaoui (born Abril 13, 1969) is a Moroccan retired professional tennis player who won two bronze medals at the Mediterranean Games partnering with Younes El Aynaoui. He played in twelve Davis Cup ties for Morocco from 1989 to 1993 and won fourteen of his 22 rubbers.

References

External links

Moroccan male tennis players
Living people
1969 births

Mediterranean Games bronze medalists for Morocco
Competitors at the 1991 Mediterranean Games
Competitors at the 1993 Mediterranean Games
Mediterranean Games medalists in tennis
20th-century Moroccan people
21st-century Moroccan people